Nayadupeta railway station, located in the Indian state of Andhra Pradesh, serves Naidupeta in Tirupati district.

History
The Vijayawada–Chennai link was established in 1899.

The Chirala–Elavur section was electrified in 1980–81.

Station

Nayadupeta station has three platforms. Daily, twenty seven trains pass through this station.

Amenities
Nayadupeta station has computerised reservation facilities (with all-India linkage), waiting room, retiring room, light refreshment facilities and book stall.

References

Railway stations in Nellore district
Chennai railway division
Railway stations in India opened in 1899